Local elections to Greater Manchester County Council, a Metropolitan County Council encompassing Greater Manchester, were held on 7 May 1981, resulting in large swings to Labour, giving them control of the council.

This would be the last election to the Greater Manchester County Council, with metropolitan county councils being scrapped on 31 March 1986 under the Local Government Act 1985 by the Conservative government of Margaret Thatcher. The councils' abolition came following several high-profile clashes between mostly Labour metropolitan county councils and the Conservative government over issues including overspending and high rates charging.

Results

Overall Results

Borough summary

|- class="unsortable" align="centre"
!rowspan=2 align="left"|Borough
! % 
!Cllrs
! %
!Cllrs
! %
!Cllrs
! %
!Cllrs
! %
!Cllrs
! %
!Cllrs
!rowspan=2|TotalCllrs
|- class="unsortable" align="center"
!colspan=2 bgcolor="" | Labour
!colspan=2 bgcolor=""| Conservative
!colspan=2 bgcolor="" | Liberal
!colspan=2 bgcolor="" | Green
!colspan=2 bgcolor="white"| Independent
!colspan=2 bgcolor="white"| Others
|-
|align="left"|Bolton
|bgcolor="#EEA2AD"|49.0
|bgcolor="#EEA2AD"|7
|34.4
|2
|16.2
|1
|0.0
|0
|0.0
|0
|0.4
|0
|10
|-
|align="left"|Bury
|bgcolor="#EEA2AD"|49.6
|bgcolor="#EEA2AD"|5
|34.0
|1
|14.2
|0
|0.0
|0
|2.3
|0
|0.4
|0
|6
|-
|align="left"|Manchester
|bgcolor="#EEA2AD"|55.7
|bgcolor="#EEA2AD"|16
|27.7
|3
|15.0
|1
|0.5
|0
|0.0
|0
|1.1
|0
|20
|-
|align="left"|Oldham
|bgcolor="#EEA2AD"|50.5
|bgcolor="#EEA2AD"|7
|30.5
|1
|18.0
|1
|0.0
|0
|0.0
|0
|1.0
|0
|9
|-
|align="left"|Rochdale
|bgcolor="#EEA2AD"|43.5
|bgcolor="#EEA2AD"|5
|29.7
|0
|24.3
|2
|0.0
|0
|0.0
|0
|2.5
|0
|7
|-
|align="left"|Salford
|bgcolor="#EEA2AD"|59.8
|bgcolor="#EEA2AD"|11
|23.8
|0
|15.3
|1
|0.0
|0
|0.0
|0
|1.1
|0
|12
|-
|align="left"|Stockport
|29.0
|3
|bgcolor="lightblue"|37.7
|bgcolor="lightblue"|6
|32.1
|2
|0.7
|0
|0.0
|0
|0.4
|0
|11
|-
|align="left"|Tameside
|bgcolor="#EEA2AD"|57.3
|bgcolor="#EEA2AD"|9
|29.7
|0
|11.9
|0
|0.6
|0
|0.0
|0
|0.4
|0
|9
|-
|align="left"|Trafford
|36.6
|3
|bgcolor="lightblue"|43.1
|bgcolor="lightblue"|6
|20.4
|0
|0.0
|0
|0.0
|0
|0.0
|0
|9
|-
|align="left"|Wigan
|bgcolor="#EEA2AD"|65.8
|bgcolor="#EEA2AD"|12
|16.5
|0
|14.5
|1
|0.0
|0
|0.0
|0
|3.2
|0
|13
|- class="unsortable" class="sortbottom" style="background:#C9C9C9"
|align="left"| Total
|49.6
|78
|30.6
|19
|18.4
|9
|0.2
|0
|0.2
|0
|1.0
|0
|106
|-
|}

References

1981 English local elections
1981